Tuo Tong (born 27 April 1984) is a Chinese fencer who competed in the team épée event at the 2004 Summer Olympics.

References

External links
 

1984 births
Living people
Chinese male épée fencers
Olympic fencers of China
Fencers at the 2004 Summer Olympics
Fencers from Chongqing